Ray Russell Bentley (born November 25, 1960) is a former professional American football linebacker, broadcaster, and author.

Biography

Playing career
Bentley's first three years in professional football were spent with the Michigan Panthers and Oakland Invaders of the United States Football League.

He later joined the Buffalo Bills, and played six seasons with the team, including their first two Super Bowl years in the 1990s. Bentley's career ended with the Cincinnati Bengals in 1992, in which he set the team's franchise record for the longest fumble return touchdown (75 yards).

Broadcasting career
Bentley worked as part of the NFL on Fox broadcast team for four years from 1998 to 2001, doing both color commentary and play-by-play. He left Fox for a position as head coach and general manager of the Arena Football League's Buffalo Destroyers, and held that position for two years before resigning.

From 2003 to 2006, Bentley was a color commentator alongside play-by-play man Bob Papa on NBC's Arena Football League coverage, and since 2003 has served in that capacity for ESPN. In 2007, Bentley returned to the Buffalo Bills as a play-by-play announcer for their preseason television games, a role he still serves. He is also an advisory member for the revival of the USFL.

From 2009 to 2016
Bentley was a radio personality on 107.3 in Grand Rapids MI. In 2012 he was the linebacker coach for the Grandville Bulldogs. Ray is currently a defensive coordinator for the high school team Byron Center Bulldogs.

Author
Bentley is the author of a series of children's books about the character of Darby the Dinosaur.

References

1960 births
Living people
American football linebackers
Arena football announcers
ArenaBowl broadcasters
Buffalo Bills announcers
Buffalo Bills players
Central Michigan Chippewas football players
Cincinnati Bengals players
College football announcers
Columbus Destroyers coaches
Michigan Panthers players
National Football League announcers
Oakland Invaders players
Olympic Games broadcasters
Sportspeople from Grand Rapids, Michigan
Players of American football from Grand Rapids, Michigan